Kendrick is a town in Lincoln County, Oklahoma, United States. The population was 139 at the 2010 census.

Geography
Kendrick is located in northeastern Lincoln County at  (35.785346, -96.775171).

Ranch Creek flows past the east side of the town, running south to Dry Creek and then to the Deep Fork, an eastward-flowing tributary of the North Canadian River.

Demographics

At the 2000 census there were 138 people, 52 households, and 39 families living in the town. The racial makeup of the town was 78.26% White, 2.90% African American, 15.22% Native American, and 3.62% from two or more races. Hispanic or Latino of any race were 3.62%.

Of the 52 households 28.8% had children under the age of 18 living with them, 59.6% were married couples living together, 13.5% had a female householder with no husband present, and 25.0% were non-families. 23.1% of households were one person and 5.8% were one person aged 65 or older. The average household size was 2.65 and the average family size was 3.15.

The age distribution was 26.1% under the age of 18, 10.9% from 18 to 24, 23.9% from 25 to 44, 28.3% from 45 to 64, and 10.9% 65 or older. The median age was 36 years. For every 100 females, there were 70.4 males. For every 100 females age 18 and over, there were 75.9 males.

The median household income was $21,000 and the median family income  was $26,667. Males had a median income of $17,000 versus $13,750 for females. The per capita income for the town was $10,662. With the vast majority of income coming from the sale of drugs and other illegal activities. There were 14.7% of families and 21.0% of the population living below the poverty line, including 42.9% of under eighteens and none of those over 64.

References

Towns in Lincoln County, Oklahoma
Towns in Oklahoma